The Erie Metropolitan Transit Authority (EMTA) is the Municipal Authority that owns and operates the public transport system in Erie County, Pennsylvania which includes the 'e', the area's transit buses; LIFT, the county paratransit service; and Bayliner Trolley, the downtown circulator.

History

The first public transportation system in Erie was established on March 1, 1897, as the Erie City Passenger Railway Company. On October 8, 1888, the Erie Electric Motor Company took control of the Erie City Passenger Railway. The Conneaut and Erie Railway Traction Company was formed in 1903 and ran trolleys to east of the city. On December 24, 1906, the Buffalo and Lake Erie Traction Company took control of the Erie Electric Motor Company and completed its  line to Buffalo, New York in 1909. When the Conneaut and Erie was abandoned on September 16, 1922, the West Ridge Transportation Company was started the next year to run buses along the abandoned trolley route. The Buffalo and Lake Erie was reorganized into the Buffalo and Erie Railway Company on September 5, 1924, and the streetcar system in Erie was split from the Buffalo and Erie to form the Erie Railways Company. Unable to expanded to invest in an expansion of the streetcar system, four Yellow Coach "Z"'s were acquired and were operated by the Erie Coach Company, a newly formed subsidiary of the Erie Railways Company in 1925. The last of its trolleys ran between Erie and New York on December 1, 1932. The streetcars were put out of service in 1935. The city and county took over the Erie Coach Company and formed the Erie Metropolitan Transit Authority on September 20, 1966.

The Erie Metropolitan Transit Authority renamed its bus service "the 'e'" on June 11, 2010.

The 'e'

Routes

Bus fleet

List of EMTA's fleet
OBI
II (02.502)
VII (07.501) "3rd Generation"
NFI 
D35LF
D40LF
C35LF CNG†
Gillig
LF-35 Trolley Replica
LF-35
LF-40
LF-29", 35” & 40" CNG†
Optima
AH-28 American Heritage Streetcar (trolley-replica buses)

† Twentynine Gillig CNG buses, only alternative fuel in fleet, Eight more coming in Summer 2021.

LIFT 
"LIFT" is EMTA's paratransit program in that provides door-to-door transportation services to people who have physical disabilities, are senior citizens or anyone who lives "beyond the bus routes or are unable to utilize bus services."  Some passengers qualify for free rides while others may have to pay a minimum of $1.65 to ride.

Other programs
Until 2008, EMTA offered a "trackless" trolley that could be rented for special occasions; while the rental program has been discontinued, this type of vehicle is still used for Route 20.  Another program from EMTA is their "Bike on the Bus" program for bicyclists that allows them to take the bus to a destination while carrying their bike on a rack on the front of the bus for free. EMTA has a "Bayliner Trolley" route, using trackless trolleys, that takes the place of the Park and ride service in Erie.  Currently, there is no fare on the Bayliner route.

See also
Transportation in Erie, Pennsylvania

Notes

References

External links

 Erie Metropolitan Transit Authority

Bus transportation in Pennsylvania
American companies established in 1966
Transit authorities with natural gas buses
Transport companies established in 1966
Municipal authorities in Pennsylvania
Transportation in Erie County, Pennsylvania
Government of Erie County, Pennsylvania
Transit agencies in Pennsylvania
1966 establishments in Pennsylvania
Paratransit services in the United States